During the 1980s and 1990s a relatively large number of companies appeared selling primarily 2D graphics cards and later 3D. Most of those companies have subsequently disappeared, as the increasing complexity of GPUs substantially increased research and development costs. Many of these companies subsequently went bankrupt or were bought out. Intel and VIA Technologies remain as producers of primarily integrated solutions, while Matrox targets niche markets. Amongst the notable discrete graphics card vendors, ATI Technologies — acquired by AMD in 2006 and since renamed to AMD — and NVIDIA are the only ones that have lasted.

Defunct graphics chip makers
These companies designed graphics chips and cards.

3dfx Interactive - assets were acquired by NVIDIA during its Chapter 11 bankruptcy
3Dlabs - merged with Creative Labs' personal entertainment division to form ZiiLABS
Advanced Logic Research – acquired by Gateway Computers 
Ark Logic
ArtX - acquired by ATI Technologies
ATI Technologies - merged into and renamed AMD
Avance Logic - acquired by Realtek
BitBoys - acquired by ATI Technologies
Chips and Technologies - acquired by Intel
Chromatic Research - acquired by ATI Technologies
Evans & Sutherland - acquired by Rockwell Collins
Gemini Technology - went bankrupt, acquired by Seiko Epson to form the Vancouver Design Center
GigaPixel - acquired by 3dfx Interactive
Headland Technologies - division of LSI Logic's Standard Products Group in late 1990s, assets sold to SPEA
IXMICRO - produced video cards for Macintosh and Macintosh clones
MOS Technology - produced the VIC and TED line of graphics chips, owned by Commodore International
Number Nine Visual Technology (originally named Number Nine Computer Corp.) - pioneer in the graphics industry, developed 1st 128-bit graphics processor; acquired by S3
Oak Technology - acquired by Zoran Corporation
OPTi Inc. - no longer makes graphics chips
Paradise Systems - acquired by Western Digital, later sold off to Philips
Primus Technology
Radius Inc. - made graphics solutions for Apple, out of business mid-1990s
Raycer - acquired by Apple Computer
Real3D - acquired by Intel
Rendition - acquired by Micron Technology
S3 - sold off its core graphics division to VIA Technologies as S3 Graphics
Silicon Graphics Incorporated (SGI) - quit developing 3D graphics in-house in the early 2000s and bought GPUs from other companies; later went completely out of business in 2009; its assets were bought in the resulting Chapter 11 bankruptcy by Rackable Systems, which changed its name to Silicon Graphics International
Tamarack Microelectronics - merged with IC Plus in 2002
Trident Microsystems - sold its video chip assets to XGI in 2003, bankrupt 2012
Tseng Labs - sold its video chip assets to ATI Technologies in 1997
Video 7 - merged with G2 to form Headland Technologies
Weitek Corporation - maker of Power9000 brand of GPUs circa 1991-1994, bankrupt 1995
Western Digital Imaging - combined efforts of Paradise Systems and Faraday Computing, bought by Western Digital and allowed to go out of business

Defunct graphics card makers

Appian Graphics - acquired by ATI Technologies
Artist Graphics - acquired by ATI Technologies
BFG Technologies - liquidated in August 2010
Boca Research - acquired by Zoom Telephonics
Cardinal Technologies - bankrupt
Genoa Systems - bankrupt
Hercules Computer Technology, Inc. - acquired by ELSA Technology, Inc., then by Guillemot Corporation
Media Vision - bankrupt
Nth Graphics - bankrupt
Orchid Technology - acquired by Micronics Computers, then by Diamond Multimedia
Paradise Systems - acquired by Western Digital, then by Philips, then de-emphasized
SPEA AG - German vendor in late 1990s, acquired by Diamond Multimedia in 1995, then by ATI in 2001
STB Systems - acquired by 3dfx Interactive in 1999
Vermont Microsystems, Incorporated (VMI)

Other
The following companies are still in operation, but no longer design PC graphics chips:

Acer Laboratories Incorporated - focusing on design and manufacturing of integrated circuits for the personal computer and embedded systems
Cirrus Logic - sold its video chip assets
Hercules - no longer manufactures graphics cards
IIT Corp - reverted to a video-conferencing solutions company, and then later a VOIP service provider
PowerVR - focusing on mobile graphics technologies
Realtek - no longer makes graphics chips
Silicon Integrated Systems (SIS) - sold its video chip assets to XGI
Texas Instruments - withdrew from the computer market
UMC - became a custom-only fab and discontinued all of its standard products in the late 1990s
XGI - focusing on embedded and mobile applications

Defunct graphics chips and card companies
Graphics chips and card companies
Graphics hardware